Cesare Perdisa (21 October 1932 – 10 May 1998) was an Italian racing driver from Bologna.  He participated in eight Formula One World Championship Grands Prix, debuting on 22 May 1955. He achieved two podiums and scored a total of five championship points.

Significantly younger than the majority of the drivers around at the time, Perdisa often gave his car to his more experienced teammates when they encountered troubles. This happened, for example, on the 11th lap of the 1956 Belgian Grand Prix, when Stirling Moss lost the right rear wheel of his Maserati. Moss brought his car to a stop and ran a quarter of a mile back to the pits where he took over Perdisa's Maserati, which he drove to the finish.

In March 1957 Perdisa withdrew from the upcoming 12 Hours of Sebring after the death of his teammate Eugenio Castellotti. Castellotti died at the Modena Autodrome when he crashed a Ferrari he was testing for the event. Although Perdisa initially claimed he was giving up racing only temporarily because of the shock he experienced when Castellotti died, he subsequently retired for good. Perdisa was Castellotti's closest friend.

Shortly after his retirement, Perdisa hit the news again in September 1957 when he rushed Juan Manuel Fangio and his wife, Andrea, to a hospital in Bologna. The couple had been thrown from their 2.5 litre Lancia Aurelia while trying to avoid a truck entering the highway. Travelling at close to 100 mph, Fangio's car had smashed into a utility pole, although he and his wife only sustained bruises.

Following his retirement, Perdisa and his brother Sergio edited the official magazine of Calderini Agricole, the largest company in Italy specialised in agriculture.

Complete Formula One World Championship results
(key) 

* Indicates shared drive with Jean Behra
† Indicates shared drive with Stirling Moss
‡ Indicates shared drive with Peter Collins and Wolfgang von Trips

References

1932 births
1998 deaths
Italian racing drivers
Italian Formula One drivers
Maserati Formula One drivers
Ferrari Formula One drivers
24 Hours of Le Mans drivers
World Sportscar Championship drivers
Sportspeople from Bologna